Somme is a First World War military history book by Lyn MacDonald, published in 1983 by Michael Joseph.

The battle
The Battle of the Somme started on Sunday, 1 July 1916 leading to the biggest losses by Britain in one single day (19,240 dead, 35,493 wounded, 2,152 missing and 85 prisoners for a total loss of 57,470). The battle ended on Tuesday, 21 November 1916. The main objective of this battle was to relieve the horrific battle at Verdun.

Writer Lyn MacDonald
MacDonald has collected testimonies of soldiers involved in the battle of the Somme. In the beginning, their stories show chauvinism, nationalism and patriotism, but later, with soldiers seeing the stalemate, reflect the despair and horror of war. Everybody agrees that war is terrible.

1983 non-fiction books
Works about the Battle of the Somme
History books about World War I
Michael Joseph books